Anarta stigmosa is a species of moth of the family Noctuidae. It is found from South-eastern Europe, Turkey, Israel and Iran to central Asia, southern Siberia, China and Mongolia.

Adults are on wing from April to May in Israel and from May to July and from August to October in Italy in two generations.

The larvae feed on various species of Atriplex, Salsola and Chenopodium and probably other halophilous shrubs.

Subspecies
Anarta stigmosa stigmosa
Anarta stigmosa atlantica (France, Corsica, Italy)

References

External links 
 Hadeninae of Israel

stigmosa
Moths described in 1887
Moths of Europe
Moths of Asia